ART4.RU Contemporary Art Museum is a museum of contemporary Russian art located in Moscow, Russia. It was opened to the public in May 2007. A privately owned institution, it houses the collection of Igor Markin.

The Collection
The Museum often lends works in its permanent collection to exhibitions organized by other institutions in Russia and worldwide, such as in the National Centre for Contemporary Arts 2009 exhibition, "In Pursuit of Meaning: Alexander Ney" and, more recently, in the Moscow Museum of Modern Art's 2012 retrospective "Leonid Sokov: Point of View".

The collection includes works of artists:

 Alexeev Alexeev
 Brodsky Alexander
 Brusilovsky Mikhail
 Bruskin Grisha
 Bugaev Sergei (Africa)
 Bulatov Erik
 Dubossarsky Vladimir
 Duritskaya Natalia
 Infante Arana Francisco
 Kabakov Ilya
 Komar & Melamid
 Kosolapov Alexander
 Kulik Oleg
 Mikhailov Boris
 Molitor & Kuzmin
 Neizvestny Ernst
 Nemukhin Vladimir
 Ney Alexander
 Novikov Timur
 Osmolovsky Anatoly
 Plavinsky Dmitry
 Ponomarev Alexandr
 Prigov Dmitry
 Pusenkoff George
 Pushnitsky Vitaly
 Rabin Oscar
 Roginsky Mikhail
 Shutov Sergei
 Tselkov Oleg
 Yakovlev Vladimir
 Yankilevsky Vladimir
 Zakharov Vadim
 Zverev Anatoly

References

External links 
 

Art museums and galleries in Moscow
Modern art museums
Museums established in 2007
2007 establishments in Russia